The  Diocese of Tuxtepec is a Latin Church ecclesiastical territory or diocese of the Catholic Church in Mexico. It is a suffragan in the ecclesiastical province of the metropolitan Archdiocese of Antequera. The diocese's episcopal see is San Juan Bautista Tuxtepec.

Ordinaries
José de Jesús Castillo Rentería, M.N.M. (1979 - 2005) 
José Antonio Fernández Hurtado (2005 - 2014), appointed Archbishop of Durango
José Alberto González Juárez (2015 – present)

External links and references

Christian organizations established in 1979
Roman Catholic dioceses and prelatures established in the 20th century
Roman Catholic dioceses in Mexico
Roman Catholic Ecclesiastical Province of Antequera, Oaxaca